Mary Margaret Hagedorn (born September 12, 1954) is a US marine biologist specialised in physiology who has developed a conservation program for coral species, using the principles of cryobiology, the study of cellular systems under cold conditions, and cryopreservation, the freezing of sperm and embryos.

Life 
Mary Hagedorn grew up in Long Island Sound, Connecticut, where she developed an interest in oceans and sea life.  From then on, Hagedorn knew she wanted a job in aquatic species research. She received her bachelor's and master's degrees in Biology from Tufts University, and she earned her Ph.D. in Marine Biology from the Scripps Institution of Oceanography of the University of California at San Diego.  Upon graduation, Hagedorn studied fish physiology.

After a trip to the Amazon left two of her colleagues dead, Hagedorn reached a turning point in her career. She decided to stop studying electric fish and focus her physiological efforts on coral, which were impacted by the warming of the oceans.

References

Further reading

External links 
 Official Curriculum Vitae

1954 births
Living people
American marine biologists
American physiologists
Great Barrier Reef
Women physiologists
Tufts University School of Arts and Sciences alumni
Scripps Institution of Oceanography alumni
American women scientists